Mickey's Dining Car is a classic diner in downtown Saint Paul, Minnesota, United States.  It has been in continuous operation at the same location since 1939.  Designed to resemble a railroad dining car, the prefabricated building was constructed in 1937 by the Jerry O'Mahony Diner Company of Elizabeth, New Jersey, then shipped to Saint Paul by rail.  Its unusual architecture made it a local landmark.  It was listed on the National Register of Historic Places in 1983 for having local significance in the themes of architecture and commerce.  It was nominated for being "a beloved, longstanding and unique social institution," an unaltered example of railroad car-style diners, and one of the few surviving examples of its type in the American Midwest.

Description
A row of 10 train-style windows graces the front. The interior features floor-mounted round stools along a well-worn counter.

Mickey Crimmons and Bert Mattson opened Mickey's Diner in 1939. Such diners had gained popularity early in the 20th century as inexpensive, often all-night, eateries. Mickey's Diner has been operating as a family-owned business since the year it opened.

Besides its architecture, Mickey's is known for its all-day (and all-night) breakfast menu. The menu features such staples as eggs, pancakes, and hash browns. It also includes Mickey's homemade mulligan stew, hamburgers, and ice cream floats, milkshakes, and malts. The diner's website includes Mickey's schedule ("Open 24 hours a day, 365 days a year") and its "House Rules" ("No smoking, no checks, no take out").

Media appearances
Mickey's is famous beyond Minnesota. It was named one of America's Top Ten Diners by Jane and Michael Stern in Gourmet magazine. It also has been featured on travel and food television series like Unwrapped, Roker on the Road, Rachael Ray's Tasty Travels, Feasting on Asphalt, and Man v. Food. The unusual diner has been showcased in magazines such as Smithsonian, National Geographic, and Sports Illustrated.

The diner also has appeared in movies that include The Mighty Ducks series of the 1990s and Jingle All the Way (1996). The opening and closing scenes of the 2006 Robert Altman film A Prairie Home Companion were shot at Mickey's.

The diner is also featured on the front and back cover of the 1985 self-titled debut album of R&B singer Alexander O'Neal, and appears in his 1985 music video for the song "Innocent".  The diner also appears in the 1991 Pet Shop Boys music video for the song "Where the Streets Have No Name (I Can't Take My Eyes off You)".

During the 2008 Republican National Convention in Saint Paul, photographs of the diner appeared in local and national newspapers for a different reason. Police confronted about two hundred protesters in front of Mickey's Diner. They dispersed them with tear gas, pepper spray, and flash grenades.

Mickey’s by Willy 
A distinct Mickey's restaurant location under different ownership is located at 1950 West 7th Street in Saint Paul's Sibley neighborhood, Mickey’s by Willy. It is decorated in the manner of a 1950s-style diner rather than the original location which is representative of the Great Depression and World War II eras of the 1930s and '40s. The secondary location opened in 1960. The menu differs at the second location though there are overlaps. At one time there were twelve locations under the original ownership.

See also
 List of diners
 National Register of Historic Places listings in Ramsey County, Minnesota

References

External links

 Mickey's Diner

1939 establishments in Minnesota
Art Deco architecture in Minnesota
Commercial buildings completed in 1937
Commercial buildings on the National Register of Historic Places in Minnesota
Diners on the National Register of Historic Places
Diners in the United States
National Register of Historic Places in Saint Paul, Minnesota
Restaurants established in 1939
Restaurants in Minnesota
Tourist attractions in Saint Paul, Minnesota